Donegal Celtic Park, also known as Suffolk Road and Celtic Park or more recently the New Suffolk Road after its recent expansion, is the home of amateur league team Donegal Celtic. It is situated in the Suffolk Road in west Belfast. The stadium holds 8,283, but is currently restricted to 2,330 under safety legislation.

In early August 2009, work on two new stands was completed. A home stand seating 1,850 spectators and an away stand seating 800 are the first phase in a plan to create a 5000 seated capacity ground. The plan is expected to take several years to complete.

External links
 Official page including photographs and directions 
 Donegal Celtic park's new stand under construction

References 

Association football venues in Northern Ireland
Donegal Celtic F.C.
Sports venues in Belfast